William Boltman (born 16 May 1893, date of death unknown) was a South African cricketer. He played in thirteen first-class matches for Eastern Province from 1921/22 to 1931/32.

See also
 List of Eastern Province representative cricketers

References

External links
 

1893 births
Year of death missing
South African cricketers
Eastern Province cricketers
People from Graaff-Reinet
Cricketers from the Eastern Cape